Bădești may refer to several places in Romania:

 Bădești, a village in Bârla Commune, Argeș County
 Bădești, a village in Pietroșani Commune, Argeș County
 Bădești, a village in Vultureni Commune, Cluj County
 Bădești, a village in Brănești Commune, Gorj County
 Bădești, a tributary of the river Borșa in Cluj County

See also 
 Badea (disambiguation)
 Bădeni (disambiguation)
 Bădila (disambiguation)
 Bădescu (surname)